Kang Nachugo is a mountain located in Gaurishankar, Dolakha District, Nepal at an elevation of  above sea level. It was first climbed in 2008 by Joe Puryear, and David Gottlieb.

References 

Mountains of the Bagmati Province
Six-thousanders of the Himalayas
Mountain ranges of the Himalayas
Dolakha District